Ipswich Town Football Club is an English association football club founded in 1878. In 2007, the club created a hall of fame into which a number of personnel associated with the club are inducted every year. The inaugural members, Ray Crawford, Mick Mills, Ted Phillips and John Wark, were selected in 2007 by a ballot of former Ipswich players.

, five of the Hall of Fame's inductees are club record holders.  England international Crawford remains Ipswich Town's all-time top scorer, with 203 goals between 1958 and 1969.  Allan Hunter, inducted in 2009, is the most internationally capped player while at Ipswich, having played for Northern Ireland 47 times while at the club. England international Mills is the club's all-time appearance record-holder having played 741 competitive matches.  Phillips is the club's all-time season top-scorer, scoring 46 goals in the 1956–57 season when Ipswich played in the Football League Third Division South.

John Elsworthy (inducted 2008) is the earliest player to represent Ipswich to be inducted into the Hall of the Fame, having played for the club from 1949 to 1964, while Republic of Ireland international Matt Holland (inducted 2014) is the most recent representative of the club to be inducted. The inductees include six posthumous members, amongst them managers Alf Ramsey who led the club to back-to-back division titles in the 1960–61 and 1961–62 seasons before going on to manage England to victory in the 1966 FIFA World Cup, and John Lyall who took Ipswich into the inaugural Premier League in 1992.

Members

Footnotes

References

General

Specific

Ipswich Town F.C.
 Hall Of Fame
Ipswich Town Hall Of Fame
Halls of fame in England
2007 establishments in England
Association football museums and halls of fame
Association football player non-biographical articles